Robert Kayen is a civil engineer, geologist, scientist at the United States Geological Survey, and Adjunct Professor at the University of California, Berkeley in Civil and Environmental Engineering. He is a leading international expert in the fields of earthquake engineering, seismic soil liquefaction, and seismic displacement analysis of ground failures. Kayen's research focuses on geotechnical engineering, engineering characterization of natural hazards and extreme events, and earth science aspects of civil engineering. His works have been applied in earthquake engineering design of improved ground, building foundations, bridge abutments, lifeline, and environmental systems.

Education and academia
Robert Kayen was born in New York, NY, United States in 1959. He earned his B.S. in civil engineering and geology in 1981 from Tufts University, M.S. degree in geology in 1988, and Ph.D. in engineering under the supervision of James K. Mitchell at the University of California, Berkeley in California in 1993. Since 1991, he has worked as a research scientist at the U.S. Geological Survey in Menlo Park, California.  Kayen joined the faculty of Civil and Environmental Engineering at the University of California, Los Angeles in 2007, and the University of California, Berkeley in 2018. He has previously served on the faculties of Kobe University, Japan and University of California, Berkeley as a visiting professor. Kayen has authored several hundred journal articles and published studies in the fields of earthquake engineering, LIDAR geomatics, engineering geophysics, methane hydrate disassociation, and marine-engineering geology and marine-geotechnics.

Honors
Kayen was awarded the Thomas A. Middlebrooks Award from the American Society of Civil Engineers. For his contributions as a court-appointed expert to the scientific studies supporting United States vs. Montrose Chemical Corp. et al., he received a Commendation awarded by the United States Department of Justice. He received the Ames Honor Award in 2010 from NASA Ames Research Center for unique applications of the spectral analysis of surface waves and ground-penetrating RADAR. Kayen has served on the editorial board of several journals including the Geotechnical and Geoenvironmental Engineering Journal of the American Society of Civil Engineers (ASCE).  In 2017, he was the ASCE GeoInstitute - UC Berkeley Distinguished Lecturer in Civil Engineering.

Rock climbing and ski mountaineering
Robert Kayen is an American rock climber who completed the first solo ascent of El Capitan's West Buttress in Yosemite National Park in 1982.  The eleven-day solo ascent followed the original route on the West Buttress, first climbed by Layton Kor and Steve Roper in 1963.  Kayen skied the first winter traverse of the Sierra Nevada mountains along   between Mount Whitney and Lake Tahoe in 1984 and 1985, skiing via the John Muir Trail and the high-elevation portions of the Tahoe–Yosemite Trail.

References

External links
 Googe Scholar Sitations
 
 Science Direct
 National Academies Press

Tufts University School of Arts and Sciences alumni
Tufts University School of Engineering alumni
Living people
1959 births
American rock climbers